Samanlıköy is a village in Dikili district of İzmir Province, Turkey.   The population of Samanlıköy is 100  as of 2011.

References

Villages in Dikili District